Robinsons Roxas (formerly Robinsons Place Roxas) is a shopping mall located at Immaculate Heart of Mary Avenue, Brgy. Lawa-an, Roxas City, Capiz. It is the 36th operating mall of Robinsons Land Corporation.

The mall was supposedly to open on December 2, 2013 but moved to February 13, 2014 after Typhoon Haiyan (Yolanda) struck Roxas City.

Overview
A two-level full service mall, Robinsons Place Roxas houses over 160 outlets for shopping, dining, service and entertainment. It has four digital cinemas including one 3D cinema and also includes a parking lot with over 800 car slots and 200 motorcycle slots. It is the first full service mall and the largest in Northern Panay island.

Location
It is located in Pueblo de Panay, a  mixed-use, master planned township development in Roxas City.

See also
Robinsons Malls

References

Shopping malls in the Philippines
Buildings and structures in Roxas, Capiz
Tourist attractions in Capiz
Robinsons Malls
Shopping malls established in 2014